The Premier Hockey League (PHL) is a field hockey competition organised by South African Hockey Association.

Format
All matches for PHL will be played at the Randburg Hockey Stadium in Johannesburg – on a Saturday and Sunday. The event consists of a league stage and a play-off stage:
Each team will play each other once in the league stage. This means each team will play 5 games. The teams who finish 5th and 6th respectively in the log, at the end of the league stage, will be knocked out of the competition. The top four teams in the log will progress to the semi-finals. The losing semi-finalists will play-off for 3rd and 4th respectively and the winning semi-finalists will progress to the finals of the men’s and women’s competitions.

The team identities have been inspired by famous tourist areas in South Africa and are representative of all nine Provinces.

Teams

Men

Women

Men's tournament

Summaries

Awards

Women's tournament

Summaries

Awards

Broadcasting
SuperSport

See also
Hockey India League
Hockey One

References

 
Field hockey competitions in South Africa
2016 establishments in South Africa
2020 disestablishments in South Africa
Sports leagues established in 2016
Sports leagues disestablished in 2020